Mr Karate is an Egyptian sports drama film directed by Mohamed Khan and released in 1993, stars Ahmad Zaki as an originally naive out of towner who is brought down by the hardships of life in Cairo.  Broke and unemployed, Zaki's character gets a stint as a garage worker before graduating to the more lucrative, albeit less dignified, profession of illicit parking helper (monadi).  After an acquaintance with a local retired karate instructor (played by Ibrahim Nasr), Zaki's character is introduced to the world of martial arts through watching a series of old Bruce Lee and Jackie Chan movies which, at first, are picked out by his new friend (Nasr's character) but which he then picks out himself from a nearby video rental store where his love interest in the movie works (played by Nahla Salama).  What starts as a childish fascination, becomes with the help of Nasr, a new awakening for Zaki's character, who develops a resolve to become defenseless no more and trains in art of karate.

In one of his last interviews (if not his last) before his untimely death in March 2005, Ahmad Zaki said the only thing he regretted about Mr Karate was its title.  He said it was misleading because it led many moviegoers and critics to believe it was a lighthearted martial arts spoof, when, in fact, it was about the troubles of a simple man trying to survive the vast city that is Cairo, Egypt.  In the interview, Zaki said he had hoped for the movie to be called Cairo '90.

Soon, Zaki realizes that his newfound karate abilities allows him to help out distressed members in his community, which captures the attention of a local tycoon (who in the film remains obscure and whose exact profession - whether he is a businessman, member of parliament or even a minister - is left to the viewers' imagination).
At the time of its release, the film received mixed reviews, but it did solidify Zaki as an icon and spokesperson for the average Egyptian youth.  It also allowed him to pursue more action-packed movies during the mid-and late-1990s.

Cast
 Ahmed Zaki as Salah
 Ibrahim Nasr
 Nahla Salama
 Zouzou Nabil

Reception
Mr. Karate received mixed reviews. Andeel, from Mada Masr, found it as, "an amazing mixture of cultures and references [that] cooperate to produce the joy you receive watching it", and, as he enjoys Tarantino movies, "an earlier experiment in the same field". It is speculated that the misleading title for the film, which suggests that it is just a movie about martial arts, led to the lower ratings from reviewers.

References

External links
 

1993 films
Films directed by Mohamed Khan
Egyptian sports films
1993 martial arts films